Southeast Warren Community School District is a rural public school district headquartered in Liberty Center in unincorporated Warren County, Iowa.

The district is mostly in Warren County while there are portions in Lucas County. Incorporated communities in its service area include Lacona and Milo. Unincorporated communities include Liberty Center, which the high school is located near. The district was founded in 1959.

History
It was established in 1959 as a consolidation of the Lacona, Liberty Center, and Milo schools. , the district had about 500 students.

In 2015, a veto by the Governor for one-time money added to the state budget cost the district it's librarian due to lack of funds.

Schools
 Southeast Warren Primary School - Milo
 Southeast Warren Intermediate School - Lacona
 Southeast Warren Junior-Senior High School - Liberty Center

Southeast Warren Junior-Senior High School

Athletics
The Warhawks compete in the Pride of Iowa Conference in the following sports:

 Football
 Volleyball
 Cross Country
 Basketball
 Wrestling
 Bowling
 Golf
 Track and Field
 Baseball
 Softball
 4-time State Champions (1961 (summer), 1961 (fall), 1962 (fall) and 1968 (summer))

See also
List of school districts in Iowa
List of high schools in Iowa

References

External links
 Southeast Warren Community School District

School districts in Iowa
Education in Warren County, Iowa
Education in Lucas County, Iowa
1959 establishments in Iowa
School districts established in 1959